The Temple of Bacchus is part of the Baalbek temple complex located in the broad Al-biqā (Bekaa Valley), Lebanon. The temple complex is considered an outstanding archaeological and artistic site of Imperial Roman Architecture and was inscribed as an UNESCO World Heritage Site in 1984. This monument to Bacchus is one of the best preserved and grandest Roman temple ruins; its age is unknown, but its fine ornamentation can be dated to the second century CE.

History
The temple was probably commissioned by Roman Emperor Antoninus Pius (r. AD 138-161).  No information was recorded about the site until a 4th-century Greek conquest, by which point the temple would likely have been closed due to the persecution of pagans in the late Roman Empire. When the complex fell into disrepair, the Temple of Bacchus was possibly protected by the rubble of the rest of the site's ruins. 

It was not until 1898-1903 that this was then made official by a German Expedition excavated two of the large temples and began reconstructions on the site. 
In 1920 The State of Greater Lebanon was proclaimed and protections and repairs of the site were mandated by the Lebanese government. 

In the mid-1970s the Lebanese civil war broke out and protections of the site ceased as Al-Biqā became a stronghold for Palestinian and Syrian forces. 
In 1984 the ruins at Baalbek were inscribed as a UNESCO World Heritage Site.
Preservation of the site began in the 1990s following the end of the war. 

The German Archaeological Institute's Orient Department has done a number of archaeological excavations and research on The Temple of Bacchus and the entire temple complex. The site is continually being researched and assessed, such as documentation of reliefs and sculptures, archaeozoological research on fauna in the ruins, urban development and its relationship to Baalbek.

Architecture

The temple is 66 m long, 35 m wide and 31 m high, making it only slightly smaller than the Temple of Jupiter. The podium on which the temple sits is on an East-West axis.  The peripheral wall is adorned by a colonnade of forty-two unfluted Corinthian columns with Ionic bases,
nineteen of which remain upright. These were probably erected in a rough state and then rounded, polished, and decorated in position. The columns support a richly carved entablature, which includes an architrave with a three-banded frieze that is decorated with alternating bulls and lions and cornice ornamented with geometric and floral patterns. 

Inside, the cella is decorated with Corinthian pilasters flanking two levels of niches on each side. The parapets are decorated with dancing Maenads, supporting the attribution of the temple to Bacchus.

The entrance was preserved as late as the 16th century, but the keystone of the lintel had slid  following the 1759 earthquakes; a column of rough masonry was erected in the 1860s or '70s to support it. The earthquakes also damaged the area around the soffit's famed inscription of an eagle, which was entirely covered by the keystone's supporting column.  Some historic Roman coins depict the structure of this temple along with Temple of Jupiter.

The Temple is enriched by some of the most refined reliefs and sculpture to survive from antiquity.  There are four sculptures carved within the peristyle that are believed to be depictions of Acarina which would make them the first recognizable representations of mites in architecture.

See also
 List of Ancient Roman temples
 Temple of Jupiter (Roman Heliopolis)

Gallery

Notes

Bibliography

 Jessup, Samuel. Ba'albek (Picturesque Palestine, Sinai and Egypt) Ed. Appleton & Co. New York, 1881

 at "A Proposal for an Integrated Risk Preparedness Strategy."

External links 

The Temple of Bacchus at Great Buildings
UNESCO World Heritage Site
UNESCO World Heritage Baalbek Documents
Britannica Baalbeck
German Archaeological Institute
Baalbek International Festival

150
2nd-century religious buildings and structures
Roman sites in Lebanon
Temples of Dionysus
Roman temples by deity
Tourism in Lebanon
Tourist attractions in Lebanon
Destroyed temples
Temples in Lebanon